Tejasswi Prakash Wayangankar (born 10 June 1993) is an Indian actress who appears in Hindi television and Marathi films. She began her acting debut with 2612 and later on appeared in Sanskaar Dharohar Apnon Ki (2013). Prakash is best known for her roles as Ragini Maheshwari in Swaragini (2015–16) and Diya Singh in Rishta Likhenge Hum Naya (2017-18). In 2020, she participated in Colors TV's stunt-based show Khatron Ke Khiladi 10.

In 2021, she participated in Colors TV's reality show Bigg Boss 15 and emerged as the winner of the show. Since February 2022, Prakash is portraying the dual roles of protagonist Pratha Gujral and her daughter Prarthna Gujral in Colors TV's thriller franchise Naagin 6. She made her Marathi film debut with Mann Kasturi Re (2022).

Early life and education 
Prakash was born on 10 June 1993 in Jeddah, Saudi Arabia, and raised in a Marathi family. She is an engineer by education. She graduated in Electronics and Telecommunications Engineering from Mumbai University.

Career

Early work (2012–2018) 

Prakash began her acting career in 2012, with Life OK's thriller 2612 playing Rashmi Bhargava. In 2013, she was seen playing Dhara Vaishnav in Colors TV's soap opera Sanskaar - Dharohar Apnon Ki opposite Jay Soni.

From 2015 to 2016, she portrayed the leading role of Ragini Maheshwari in Colors TV's popular drama romance Swaragini - Jodein Rishton Ke Sur  which earned her nominations for Indian Telly Awards and Golden Petal Awards.

In 2017, she was seen portraying Diya Singh in Sony TV's mystery drama Pehredaar Piya Ki. After Pehredaar Piya Ki ended, Prakash was re-cast as Diya Singh in Rishta Likhenge Hum Naya opposite Rohit Suchanti.

In 2018, she was seen portraying Uruvi in Star Plus's Mythological Drama Karn Sangini opposite Aashim Gulati.

Success and recent work (2019–present) 

In 2019, Prakash was seen portraying Mishti Khanna in the second season of Voot's romantic drama Silsila Badalte Rishton Ka alongside Kunal Jaisingh and Aneri Vajani.

In 2020, she made her reality debut through participation in Colors TV's popular stunt-based show Fear Factor: Khatron Ke Khiladi 10 despite being one of the strongest contenders, had to quit the show midway after suffering a severe eye injury which ended her journey at the 6th place.

In 2021, she participated in Colors TV's reality show Bigg Boss 15 where she survived for 17 weeks inside the house and emerged as the winner of the show.

Soon after Bigg Boss 15 ended, In February 2022, she was signed for Ekta Kapoor's popular supernatural franchise Naagin 6 as the female protagonist Pratha Gujral, a shape-shifting serpent opposite Simba Nagpal. As a part of the leap track of the same season , she played a double role of a mother-daughter , Pratha Gujral and Prarthna Gujral.

In November 2022, Prakash made her Marathi debut alongside Abhiney Berde in romantic drama, Mann Kasturi Re directed by Sanket Mane.

Personal life

Prakash is dating actor and host Karan Kundrra. The two first met on the sets of ladies vs Gentlemen. They participated in the reality show  Bigg Boss 15 and eventually started dating after that.

In the media
Prakash was included by Femina India in their list of Beautiful Indians 2022 for 'Celebs for Good' attributing to her contribution towards the welfare of stray animals and challenged individuals.

She was included by HT City in their 30 Under 30 list of 2022 for the Television Category.
She was awarded the ‘Digital Sensation of the Year’ at Filmfare Middle East 2022 held in Dubai.

Prakash secured the 8th position in the UK list of the Top 50 Asian Celebrities in the World by Eastern Eye for her work in Indian Television in 2022.

Filmography

Films

Television

Special appearances

Web series

Music videos

Awards and nominations

References

External links

 
 

Living people
1992 births
People from Jeddah
Indian film actresses
Indian television actresses
Indian soap opera actresses
Actresses in Hindi television
Actresses in Marathi cinema
Marathi actors
University of Mumbai alumni
Indian expatriates in Saudi Arabia
Fear Factor: Khatron Ke Khiladi participants
Bigg Boss (Hindi TV series) contestants
Big Brother (franchise) winners
21st-century Indian actresses